Faslli Fakja is a former Albanian football who played for Vllaznia Shkodër in the 1980s, where he was part of the 1982–83 National Championship winning team playing alongside international players Ferid Rragami and Fatbardh Jera.

He was also joint top goalscorer in the league for the 1984–85 season alongside Arben Minga.

Honours
Albanian Superliga: 1
 1983

References

Year of birth missing (living people)
Living people
Footballers from Shkodër
Albanian footballers
Association football forwards
Albania youth international footballers
KF Vllaznia Shkodër players
Kategoria Superiore players